Eupithecia stellata is a moth in the family Geometridae first described by George Duryea Hulst in 1896. It is found in North America from central Manitoba to northern Alberta and south to California and Mexico.

The wingspan is about 20 mm. Adults have mottled brown-pink forewings crossed by irregular black basal and median bands. The hindwings are paler than the forewings and have dark grey-pink shading along the outer margin. There are two generations with adults on wing in early June and again from late July to the beginning of September.

References

Moths described in 1896
stellata
Moths of North America